Edward Harry Deezen (born March 6, 1957) is a former American actor and comedian, best known for his roles as "nerd" characters in films including Grease, Grease 2, Midnight Madness, I Wanna Hold Your Hand, 1941, and WarGames. He has had larger starring roles in independent films such as Surf II, Mob Boss, Beverly Hills Vamp, and Teenage Exorcist.

Deezen is also a prolific voice actor, whose more notable characters include Mandark in the Cartoon Network series Dexter's Laboratory, Snipes the Magpie in Rock-a-Doodle, Ned in Kim Possible, and the Know-It-All Kid in The Polar Express.

Early life
Edward Harry Deezen was born in Cumberland, Maryland, on March 6, 1957, the son of Irma and Robert Deezen. He was raised Jewish. A class clown in his youth, Deezen aspired to become a stand-up comedian; he moved to Hollywood within days of graduating high school in order to pursue a comedy career.

As a stand-up comedian, Deezen performed at The Comedy Store and appeared on an episode of The Gong Show in the mid-1970s, only to be gonged by singer-songwriter Paul Williams. After a poorly-received act and having difficulty memorizing his routine, Deezen eventually decided to abandon stand-up and focus on acting.

Career

Mainstream film
In 1977, Deezen landed his first role in the film Grease, playing nerdy student Eugene Felsnic. 

Following the commercial success of Grease, Deezen was cast in a series of comedy films, including Robert Zemeckis' I Wanna Hold Your Hand and Steven Spielberg's epic comedy 1941. By 1979, Deezen was in such demand that he was frequently obliged to decline some roles as he was already working: two such notable instances included the characters of Eaglebauer in Rock 'n' Roll High School and Spaz in Meatballs, both of which he turned down to appear in 1941. Throughout the early 1980s, Deezen appeared in several high-profile studio releases, including Midnight Madness (1980), Zapped! (1982) and WarGames (1983), as well as reprising the role of Eugene Felsnic in Grease 2 (1982), one of only seven actors from the original Grease to return for the sequel.

In 1984, Deezen was cast in a major television role, playing the role of superintendent Eddie on the first season of the NBC sitcom Punky Brewster. After filming eight episodes, however, Deezen quit due to his discomfort while performing for a live audience and continuing difficulty in remembering his lines.

Independent film
After WarGames wrapped, Deezen worked exclusively in independent film for the remainder of the 1980s, starting with his first starring role in the 1984 cult comedy Surf II: The End of the Trilogy, where he played the antagonist, mad scientist Menlo Schwartzer.

Deezen worked steadily throughout the remainder of the 1980s and early 1990s, continuing to play stereotypical "nerds" in both bit parts and major roles, including The Whoopee Boys (1986), the ensemble comedy Million Dollar Mystery (1987), Critters 2: The Main Course (1988), and The Silence of the Hams (1994). He worked several times alongside comedian Tim Conway, most notably appearing in two of his Dorf videos, and struck up a partnership with low-budget filmmaker and producer Fred Olen Ray, who gave Deezen leading roles with the films Beverly Hills Vamp (1988), Mob Boss (1990), and Teenage Exorcist (1991).

Following his cameo appearance as a security guard in the 1996 Leslie Nielsen spoof Spy Hard, Deezen wouldn't appear in a live-action film for another 17 years. In a July 2009 interview, Deezen talked about his struggle maintaining an acting career, saying "The truth is, it is extremely tough to sustain a career in Hollywood. It is tough enough ever getting work, just the sheer odds. I loved John [Badham] and Matthew [Broderick] and it would definitely be my pleasure to work with them again. Believe me, if the right role was there and available, I'd be there in a second".

Throughout the 2010s, Deezen appeared in several short films, including as himself in 2012's I Love You, Eddie Deezen, a nervous airline passenger in 2015's Flight Fright and opposite Larry Thomas and Caryn Richman in the short comedy The Love Suckers, which screened at the 2017 New York City International Film Festival. Deezen returned to live-action films in Fred Olen Ray's 2013 television film All I Want for Christmas in a cameo as a supposed A-list action film star being interviewed on a daytime talk show.

Voice acting
In the mid-1980s, Deezen transitioned into voice acting, a change of pace he favored due to better pay and not needing to memorize extensive dialogue. His early voice roles included Donnie Dodo in Sesame Street Presents: Follow That Bird (1985), and Snipes the Magpie in Don Bluth's 1991 film Rock-a-Doodle. According to a 2011 interview, Deezen unsuccessfully auditioned for the role of the title character in Robert Zemeckis's Who Framed Roger Rabbit, losing out to comedian Charles Fleischer. He was also considered for the role of Judge Doom in the film along with several other actors that were considered but lost the role to Christopher Lloyd.

Deezen eventually found full-time voice work on television in the mid-1990s, playing recurring characters on the animated series Grimmy, Duckman, Kim Possible and What's New, Scooby-Doo?, as well as guest spots on many others, including Johnny Bravo, Recess, and Darkwing Duck. His best-known voice-over character, however, is that of Mandark, the nemesis of the eponymous Dexter on Cartoon Network's Dexter's Laboratory, a role he played for the series' entire run from 1996 to 2003. Deezen also voiced the character on the TV special Dexter's Laboratory: Ego Trip and the video games Cartoon Network Racing and FusionFall.

In 2004, Deezen supplied voice and motion capture performance for Robert Zemeckis' holiday film The Polar Express, playing the role of the nerdy "Know-It-All". He reprised this role for the subsequent video game.

Deezen regularly voice acts in radio and television commercials. In the late 1990s, he provided the voice of Pop (of Snap, Crackle and Pop) in commercials for Rice Krispies cereal, and Nacho, the mascot for Taco Bells kid's meals commercials, alongside Rob Paulsen as Dog. In 2011, Deezen was under consideration for succeeding Gilbert Gottfried as the voice of the Aflac Duck but did not win the role. Deezen retired from acting in 2016.

Personal life
Deezen lives in Cumberland, Maryland. He is a fan of The Beatles, and was interviewed as himself for the unreleased 2005 film Me and Graham: The Soundtrack of Our Lives a documentary following two filmmakers searching the US and UK for the ultimate Beatles fan. For over a year his official website featured a difficult Beatles trivia quiz - devised by Deezen himself - with a $100 prize for anyone who could answer all the questions correctly. Deezen revealed in a later interview that nobody had ever claimed the prize.

Deezen also has a strong interest in pop culture trivia, and since 2011 has contributed to several trivia websites including mental_floss, TodayIFoundOut.com and Neatorama.com. While most of Deezen's articles focus on The Beatles and their members, he also writes about such subjects as baseball, American history and classic comedy acts like The Three Stooges, the Marx Brothers, and Martin and Lewis.

In June 2021, Deezen was dropped by his public relations manager Steve Joiner after a waitress accused Deezen of stalking her while at work and writing abusive Facebook posts about her.

Health
On January 6, 2020, Deezen underwent open heart surgery at Ruby Memorial Hospital in Morgantown, West Virginia. On January 16, 2020, he developed an infection of pneumonia while recovering at the hospital. He was then transferred to a rehab facility in Cumberland, Maryland on February 6, 2020 to begin recovery.

Legal troubles
On September 16, 2021, Deezen was arrested for allegedly assaulting a police officer after refusing to leave a restaurant in LaVale, Maryland. According to the Allegany County Sheriff's Department, he had been asked by the restaurant's staff after causing a disturbance and refused to do so, prompting a response from law enforcement. Upon the deputy's arrival, Deezen hid behind a woman in a booth, refused multiple orders to exit, and reportedly threw plates, bowls, and food that struck one of the deputies. Deezen was eventually removed and detained in the Allegany County Jail to await a court appearance, where he will face charges of second degree assault, disorderly conduct and trespassing.

On April 8, 2022, Deezen was arrested after he had unlawfully entered into a nursing facility. Two hours before his arrest, he had been told to stay away from the property. According to the Maryland State Police, Deezen has been charged with fourth-degree burglary, two counts of trespassing, and one count for disturbing the peace. He was then taken to Allegany County Detention Center. According to Deezen's friend and former social media manager Bob Barnett, it was revealed that Deezen has been struggling with a mental disorder at the time of the incident. In August 2022, he was ruled unfit to stand trial as a result of his mental health struggles and is undergoing treatment at the Maryland Department of Health and that he will remain there until he no longer poses a threat.

Filmography

Film

Television

Video games

References

External links

Interviews
 Interview with Kittenpants.org
 READ Magazine Interview
 Rogue Cinema Interview
 The Radio Dan Show Interview (Audio Interview)
 Revenge of the 80s Radio Interview (Audio Interview)
 I Heart Chaos Interview

1957 births
Living people
20th-century American male actors
21st-century American male actors
American male comedians
American male film actors
Male actors from Maryland
American male television actors
American male video game actors
American male voice actors
Actors from Cumberland, Maryland
Male actors from Los Angeles
Comedians from California
20th-century American comedians
21st-century American comedians
Jewish American male actors
Jewish American male comedians
21st-century American Jews
American prisoners and detainees